Ananda Everingham (born 31 May 1982) is a Thai actor and model. Working primarily in Thai films, he is best known for his lead role in the 2004 horror film, Shutter.

Biography
Ananda Matthew Everingham is the son of a Laotian-born mother, Keo Sirisomphone and Australian father, Bangkok-based photojournalist John Everingham. He is of Lao and Australian descent.

His parents' story was loosely dramatised in the 1983 NBC television movie Love Is Forever, starring Michael Landon and Laura Gemser, which tells of a photojournalist who scuba dives under the Mekong River to rescue his lover from communist-ruled Laos in 1977. His parents divorced in 1997. John remarried a Chinese woman. Ananda has one brother and two half brothers.

Ananda was born in Thailand and attended Bangkok Patana School. He holds Australian citizenship and visited Brisbane, Australia, on school holidays.

Aside from Shutter, Ananda has starred in the horror-comedy Ghost Delivery and the teen-slasher movie 303 Fear Faith Revenge. In 2005, he starred in the Singaporean romance film The Leap Years. Two years later, he played the lead roles in the romantic dramas Me... Myself and Bangkok Time. He had featured roles in the Singaporean film Pleasure Factory and in Pen-ek Ratanaruang's Ploy.

In 2008, he appeared not only in the Nonzee Nimibutr film Queen of Langkasuka but also in Sabaidee Luang Prabang, the first Laotian commercial film produced since Laos adopted communism in 1975.

Filmography

Film

Television

Awards

References

External links

 
 Ananda Everingham at the Thai Film Database

1982 births
Ananda Everingham
Living people
Australian people of English descent
Australian people of Laotian descent
Ananda Everingham
Ananda Everingham